Rest Stop: Don't Look Back is a 2008 American horror film directed by Shawn Papazian and written by John Shiban. It is the sequel to the 2006 film Rest Stop, and stars Richard Tillman, Jessie Ward, Graham Norris, and Brionne Davis. The only actors to return from the first film are Joey Mendicino (Jesse Hilts) and the Winnebago Family (Diane Salinger, Michael Childers, Gary and Edmund Entin, and Mikey Post).

The film was released direct-to-video in the United States on September 30, 2008, by Warner Home Video.

Plot
In 1972, a family in a motorhome encounters the Driver standing on the side of the road next to the yellow pickup, out of gas. Once in the R.V., the mother flirts heavily with the Driver, asking Scotty, her physically deformed child, to take a picture with his camera.

Later that night, the Father finds the Driver having sexual intercourse with his wife. His wife then falsely claims she is being raped and prompts her husband to attack, torture, and kill the Driver. The Driver's ghost later kills the family across the street from the rest stop.

Thirty-five years later and one year after Jesse and Nicole disappeared. In Argyle, Texas, Jesse's brother Tom returns from Iraq. Tom decides to go looking for his brother with his girlfriend Marilyn and one of Nicole's friends, Jared, who has had a long-time crush on Nicole.

Once they get to California, the trio asks for directions from a strange gas station attendant. Jared finds a horseriding badge that belonged to Nicole, prompting Tom to demand information from the attendant, who tells them that the Old Highway is a mile up the road.

Not long afterward, Jared stops at a construction site porta-potty which the Driver rams into, covering Jared in feces causing him to strip down to his briefs. Tom and Marilyn arrive at the rest stop, where the Driver kidnaps Tom while Marilyn is using the bathroom. Marilyn sees Nicole's ghost inside the bathroom in an adjacent stall. She rushes out of the bathroom, and all signs of Tom and their truck have vanished.

As night falls, Jared changes clothes and sees Nicole's ghost as he gets in his car, which he believes is real. They then have sex while Nicole vomits blood and disappears. Jared then runs into the road and comes across the R.V. family, who gives him a ride to the rest stop. Jared relays what he knows to Marilyn, who, in turn, tells him Tom is missing. They decide to hike back to the gas station to find out everything the attendant knows.

Meanwhile, the Driver tortures Tom on the school bus but escapes while the Driver is gone. He searches for his brother, finding him tied up in a cage. He frees him and carries him to his truck. Jesse turns to his brother and says, "You should have saved me?" before disappearing, leaving Tom confused before heading back to the rest stop.

Marilyn and Jared learn from the attendant that they need to burn the Driver's eyeballs to put him to rest. But the Driver set a trap for them. When Jared awakes, The Driver claims, using the attendant to talk for him, that Marilyn was unfaithful to Tom and needed to be "cleansed." Jared refuses and has his right eye cut out by the Driver. Jared then gives in and uses a drill to "cleanse" Marilyn by drilling into her thighs.

Tom arrives at the gas station to find Marilyn alone. Just as day breaks, they exit the station to find the aged and abandoned motorhome parked outside. Scotty tells them that the twins have the Driver's eyeballs. Tom loads up with an assault rifle he kept in his backseat to take on the Driver. Marilyn finds Jared inside the R.V. with a patch on his eye. He assists her in setting fire to the motorhome, destroying it. Just before the Driver kills Tom, he disappears as the motorhome explodes.

On the way home, Jared discovers a picture of Nicole that he kept on his visor is missing. Just as he tries to tell Tom, he smashes into the motorhome.

Sometime later that day, Tom ponders Jared's disappearance and emotes to Marilyn, who is crying next to him. When Tom asks what is wrong, Marilyn responds, "You should have saved me." Tom begins to ask what she is talking about, only to be interrupted by the Driver revving his engine. Tom looks out the window and into the truck's cab, seeing Marilyn in the passenger's seat next to the Driver. Tom rushes out onto the empty highway and realizes that Marilyn is dead.

The Driver then drives down a different highway.

Cast

Reception
Cinema Blend said of the film, "A scary movie is made through the story...the end result is a laughable mess that feels more like a car zooming down the highway with no brakes."

References

External links

2008 films
2008 direct-to-video films
2008 horror films
2000s English-language films
2000s ghost films
Adultery in films
American ghost films
American horror films
American sequel films
Direct-to-video horror films
Direct-to-video sequel films
Films produced by Daniel Myrick
Films scored by Bear McCreary
Films set in 1972
Films set in 2007
Films set in California
Films set in Texas
Warner Bros. direct-to-video films
2000s American films